Maung Gyi is a Burmese martial artist that introduced Bando into the United States. He is the chief instructor for the American Bando Association.

Biography
Maung Gyi was born in 1936. He father was Ba Than (Gyi). He was the Director of Physical Education and Sports in the Ministry of Education in Burma.

In the early 1960s, Maung Gyi formally began teaching Burmese Bando at American University in Washington D.C. He coached the American Eagles men's soccer team in 1965.

In 1966, Maung Gyi established the American Bando Association (ABA) in Athens, Ohio. In recent years, Maung Gyi has worked to promote modern Burmese Bando and to be accepted into the expanding community of Asian martial arts in the United States.

Maung Gyi is a scholar of international law, psycholinguistics, and communications. Dr. Gyi was a professor at Ohio University in Athens, Ohio.  While at Ohio University, he taught Cross Cultural Communications, was interim Soccer Coach and served as boxing coach for the OU Boxing Club.

See also
American Bando Association
Hanthawaddy bando system

References

Bando, philosophy, principles et practice, Maung Gyi, IST edition, 2000
Comprehensive Asian Fighting Arts, D.F.Draeger, R.W.Smith, Kodansha, 1969

Martial arts school founders
Bandoists
Living people
1936 births
Burmese expatriates in the United States
American University people
American Eagles men's soccer coaches
Burmese football managers
Burmese male martial artists